Myles Little is an American photographer.  He is best known for his 2015 traveling photography exhibit and projected book, "One Percent: Privilege in a Time of Global Inequality."

Little, born and reared in Charleston, South Carolina in the United States, is associate photography editor of Time magazine.

References 

American photographers
Year of birth missing (living people)
Living people